Lone Tree Creek is a  tributary that joins the South Platte River in Weld County, Colorado east of Greeley.  The creek's source is west of Buford in Albany County, Wyoming.

See also
List of rivers of Colorado
List of rivers of Wyoming

References

Rivers of Albany County, Wyoming
Rivers of Weld County, Colorado
Rivers of Colorado
Rivers of Wyoming
Tributaries of the Platte River